Mount Morgan may refer to:


Mountain peaks

United States
Mount Morgan (Inyo County, California)
Mount Morgan (Mono County, California)
Mount Morgan (Montana)

Elsewhere
Mount Morgan (Antarctica)
Mount Morgan (Northern Territory), Australia, on Mittiebah Station

Other
Mount Morgan, Queensland, a town in Australia
Mount Morgan Mine, a copper, gold and silver mine in Queensland, Australia
Mount Morgan State High School

See also
 Mount Morgans Gold Mine, Western Australia
 Mount Morgans, Western Australia, an abandoned town
Morgan Mountain, California, U.S.
Morgan Peak, Antarctica
Morgan Summit, a mountain pass in California, U.S.